Association Sportive Ashanti Golden Boys known as AS Ashanti Golden Boys or shortly Ashanti GB is an association football club from Siguiri, Guinea. They are members of the Guinée Championnat National.

Reference List

Football clubs in Guinea